Cathy Fink & Marcy Marxer are a musical duo who perform folk, bluegrass and children’s music. They have performed with Pete Seeger, Theodore Bikel, Tom Paxton, Patsy Montana, Riders in the Sky and others. The Washington Area Music Association has recognized the duo with over 60 Wammie Awards for folk, bluegrass, and children’s music. 

Cathy & Marcy earned Grammy Awards for their recordings cELLAbration: a Tribute to Ella Jenkins, and Bon Appétit!: Musical Food Fun. Their CD’s Postcards and Banjo Talkin''' were Grammy Finalists in the Best Traditional Folk Album category.

Cathy & Marcy currently live in Silver Spring, Maryland and Lansing, North Carolina.

History
Cathy Fink was born in Maryland, but began her musical career in Canada in the early 1970s, busking and playing folk music in coffeehouses. A singer, guitarist, banjo player and yodeler, she made her recording debut in 1975 with Duck Donald, with whom she toured for five years and recorded three albums.

Marcy Marxer grew up in Swartz Creek, Michigan and learned to play guitar, mandolin, hammered dulcimer and button accordion while still in high school. She went to work for General Motors but continued to play at every opportunity. In 1978, after receiving theater training at the American Academy of Dramatic Arts and the Ringling Brothers Clown College, she devoted herself to music full-time.

The two met in 1980, in Toronto, Ontario, Canada, at the Mariposa Folk Festival. By 1983 they had begun writing songs together and appearing on each other's albums. Soon after, they began performing together, often in children's concerts. In 1989, they released a self-titled album, and a permanent partnership was formed.

 Awards 
14 Grammy Nominations
Grammy 2003 Best Musical Album for Children- cELLAbration: a Tribute to Ella Jenkins 
Grammy 2004 Best Musical Album for Children - Bon Appétit!Finalist John Lennon Songwriting Contest Award - 2008 - JUBILATIONJohn Lennon Songwriting Contest Grand Prize Winner, ISC Grand Prize Winner - 2005 SCAT LIKE THAT''
Dagnabbit– John Lennon Songwriting Contest Award
Names - Mid Atlantic Songwriting Contest, Best Folk Song

Discography 
 WAHOO! Community Music, Inc. 2019
 Shout & Shine (Fink, Marxer, Gleaves), Community Music, Inc. 2018
 Zoom a Little Zoom: A Ride Through Science, Community Music, Inc. 2010
 Get Up and Do Right, Community Music, Inc. 2017
 Cantale a tu Bebe, Community Music, Inc. 2017
 Dancin' in the Kitchen: Songs for All Families, Community Music, Inc. 2015
 Things Are Comin' My Way (Marcy Marxer), Community Music, Inc. 2012
 Nobody Else Like Me, A&M, 1994, Community Music, Inc. 2012
 Help Yourself, A&M, 1993, Community Music, Inc. 2012
 Rockin' the Uke, Community Music, Inc. 2011
 Sing to Your Baby – Sing Plays and Love Songs for New Families, Community Music, 2011 Peter E. Randall Publishing, 2012
 The Great American Folksong w/ Children's Chorus of Washington, SonoLuminus, 2011
 Triple Play EP, Community Music, 2010
 Banjo to Beatbox EP with Special Guest Christyles Bacon, Community Music, 2009
 Oold Time Banjo Festival, Rounder, 2007
 Banjo Talkin’, Rounder, 2007
 Scat Like That: A Musical Word Odyssey, Rounder, 2005 
 cELLAbration: A Tribute to Ella Jenkins, Smithsonian Folkways, 2004
 Bon Appetit! Musical Food Fun, Rounder, 2003
 Pocket Full of Stardust, Rounder, 2002
 Postcards, Community Music, 2002
 All Wound Up / Cathy & Marcy & Brave Combo, Rounder, 2001
 Pillow Full of Wishes, Rounder, 2000
 Changing Channels, Rounder, 1998
 Voice on the Wind, Rounder, 1997
 Blanket Full of Dreams, Rounder, 1996
 A Parent's Home Companion, Rounder, 1995
 A Cathy & Marcy Collection for Kids, Rounder, 1994
 Air Guitar, High Windy, 1994, Community Music, 2010
 Banjo Haiku, Community Music, 1992
 The Runaway Bunny/Goodnight Moon, Harper Collins, 1989
 Cathy Fink & Marcy Marxer, Sugar Hill Records, 1989
 Blue Rose, Sugar Hill Records, 1988
 When the Rain Comes Down, Rounder, 1987
 Jump Children, Rounder, 1986
 The Leading Role, Rounder Records, 1985
 Grandma Slid Down the Mountain, Rounder, 1984
 Doggone My Time, Rooster Records, 1983, Community Music, 1999

References

External links
Cathy and Marcy Homepage
Cathy Fink's YouTube Page

American street performers
American musical duos
Folk music duos
American children's musical groups
Grammy Award winners
Musical groups from Maryland
Musical groups from Michigan
American folk musical groups
Female musical duos